Buldan is a town and a district of Denizli Province in the inner Aegean Region of Turkey. Buldan district area neighbors to the east and the south three other districts of the same province, namely Güney, Akköy and Sarayköy, and to the west by the areas of three districts of Aydın Province, Buharkent, Kuyucak and Karacasu, and to the northwest by Sarıgöl district of Manisa Province.

The population of Buldan is 15,086 (as of 2010). It extends along a pretty hilltop area, with hillsides covered with pomegranates, figs, vines and blackberries. There are lovely views from the high meadows. Kestane Deresi (Chestnut Stream) is a favourite popular excursion spot situated in the upper parts of the main town.

Buldan's depending township of Yenicekent is also the site of ancient Tripolis of Phrygia.

Buldan cloth production

Historically, the town has been a very important center of Turkey's textile industry, a tradition it actively pursues to this day, still largely based on independent craftspersons.

Sanjak (subprovince) of Denizli was the most vibrant center cloth production center in western Anatolia during the later 19th century and the fame of the region rested at the time on the output of two of depending large villages, Buldan and Kadıköy, as well as the neighboring town of Babadağ.

Buldan was famed for a thin handwoven cheesecloth-type fabric, with laced edges and used chiefly for bed covers and table cloths, called as "Buldan bezi" (Buldan clothes) under the name of locality. Already back in the 19th century, the townspeople wove 40,000 pieces of all-cotton colored striped cloth used called alaca used for attires and a similar number of cotton and mattress clothes. Buldan weavers also produced over one-half million handkerchiefs and a large number of cotton curtains. Another textile from Buldan that deserves mention is a vivid violet silk (peştemal) woven as a rectangular panel to be wrapped around the body. Yet another is kaplama, colorful head coverings typical of Turkey's Aegean Region and worn by men and women alike with different colors associated with each gender and various regions. Thanks to sizable production effort, the number of looms in Buldan had risen to 1,500 by the end of the 19th century.

The town's expertise reaches further back in time and a sign at the town entry greets visitors with the pride expressed for having woven the kaftan of Beyazid I the Thunderbolt for his marriage with Hafsa Hatun, daughter of Aydinid İsa Bey, in 1390. Tripolis (Phrygia) itself, a first-century AD Roman foundation, may have had the weaving industry as its reason for coming into existence.

17th century Ottoman documents also mention Buldan's importance as a textile production center, informing that until circa 1650s, the cotton cloth woven in Buldan, Denizli and Manisa was taken to Tire for dyeing, after which time that part of the operation also started to be handled locally.

Population history
Buldan's population grown slowly since 1955. This is in great contrast to most Turkish cities. At it has even lost population or barely grew in population although in the last decade the population has been growing a lot faster than average. It is the only city in Turkey with a population of at least 10,000 but less than 20,000 residents or possibly the only of less than 10,000 that had a population of at least 10,000 in 1955.

See also
 Yenicekent
 Tripolis of Phrygia

References

Sources

 

Populated places in Denizli Province
Districts of Denizli Province
Towns in Turkey